Torsin-2A is a protein that in humans is encoded by the TOR2A gene.

References

Further reading